The Judge is a 2014 American legal drama film directed by David Dobkin. The film stars Robert Downey Jr. and Robert Duvall with Vera Farmiga, Vincent D'Onofrio, Jeremy Strong, Dax Shepard and Billy Bob Thornton in supporting roles. The film was released in the United States on October 10, 2014. It received mixed reviews; critics praised the performances of Duvall and Downey as well as Thomas Newman's score while criticizing the formulaic nature of its script and the lack of development for its supporting characters.

Duvall received multiple award nominations for his performance as Judge Joseph Palmer, including the Academy Award, Golden Globe Award, Screen Actors Guild Award and Satellite Award for Best Supporting Actor. Thomas Newman also received a Satellite Award nomination for Best Original Score.

Plot
Hank Palmer is a successful lawyer in Chicago. When Hank receives news his mother has just died, the judge grants his case a continuance. Before returning to his hometown of Carlinville, Indiana to attend the funeral, Hank argues with his neglected, unfaithful wife, Lisa, whom he is divorcing.

In Carlinville, Hank reunites with his older brother, Glen, a tire shop owner, and his mentally disabled younger brother Dale. Hank's estranged father is Judge Joseph Palmer of Carlinville's criminal court, who he merely calls "Judge." The two have been estranged due to the Judge's harsh treatment of his son in light of his youthful indiscretions, including a car accident when Hank was seventeen that had ruined Glen's future MLB career and resulted in his father sending Hank to juvenile detention rather than the recommended community service or otherwise helping his son.

From the courtroom gallery, Hank discreetly watches his father presiding a case. During the proceedings, the Judge seems momentarily confused when he is unable to recall his long-time bailiff's name. The morning after the funeral, Hank notices the Judge's car has the right-front headlight and fender damaged and accuses his father, a recovered alcoholic, of driving intoxicated. The Judge reacts defensively, having no memory of an accident. Hank's strained family relationship is further complicated by his former girlfriend, Sam Powell. He comes to believe her law school-student daughter Carla, that he had earlier flirted with, may be his daughter. Sam reveals Glen is Carla's father, having briefly slept with him when Hank unexpectedly left Carlinville.

The next day, after arguing with his father, Hank vows never to return to Carlinville and leaves for the airport. Just before Hank's flight takes off, Glen calls to say their father is a suspect in a fatal hit and run accident. The victim, Mark Blackwell, is a recently released ex-convict whom Judge had sentenced to twenty years in prison for a murder that he had committed after the Judge had earlier given Blackwell a light sentence for shooting up the victim's house.

Judge is indicted after police forensics confirm Blackwell's blood is on the Judge's Cadillac. He is charged with second-degree murder. C.P. Kennedy is hired as the Judge's defense attorney. When his defense proves ineffective, Hank takes over as lead counsel. While preparing for trial, Hank learns his father is undergoing chemotherapy for terminal cancer. The Judge's inability to remember the accident or previously recall his bailiff's name may be a side effect of chemotherapy. During this time, Hank's daughter, Lauren, arrives for a short visit, meeting her grandfather for the first time and bonding with him.

At the trial, Judge, honor-bound to his ethical responsibility, insists on testifying. He scuttles his own defense by testifying he is unable to remember the accident, but believes he may have intentionally killed Blackwell. Hank pushes the Judge until he reveals that he had previously given Blackwell a lighter sentence, the biggest mistake of his career, because Blackwell's circumstances had reminded the Judge of Hank and he'd seen the troubled son that the Judge had refused to help in the young man. Judge is convicted on a lesser charge of voluntary manslaughter and sentenced to four years in the Indiana State Prison.

Seven months later, Hank returns to Carlinville. Judge has been granted a compassionate release, allowing him to die at home. Fishing on a lake, Hank and Judge appear to have buried their mutual animosity. After praising Hank as a lawyer, the Judge suddenly and peacefully dies on the boat. The courthouse flag flies at half-mast to honor Judge. Hank visits the courthouse and spins his father's chair; it stops, facing him, indicating he is the next Judge.

Cast

Production

Development
The script was originally written by Nick Schenk. In March 2011, the script was to be rewritten by David Seidler. In April 2013, Bill Dubuque was enlisted to rewrite it. The casting of Robert Duvall, Vincent D'Onofrio, Vera Farmiga, and Dax Shepard was reported in March 2013. The studios had expressed an interest in Jack Nicholson playing Joseph, but Nicholson turned down the role and it was given to Duvall. Meester joined the cast in April 2013.

Filming
Principal photography started on May 31, 2013, in Shelburne Falls, Massachusetts. Shooting also took place in Attleboro, Belmont, Dedham, Sunderland, and Waltham, Massachusetts. Scenes were also filmed in Worcester, Massachusetts, including Worcester Regional Airport, as well as locations in Pennsylvania. The film is set in the fictional town of Carlinville, Indiana.

Music
On February 27, 2014, Thomas Newman was hired to compose the music for the film. WaterTower Music released a soundtrack album on October 7, 2014. The film's closing titles feature Willie Nelson's version of the Coldplay song "The Scientist", and Bon Iver's song "Holocene" is also featured prominently in the film.

Release
The film was shown at the opening night of the 2014 Toronto International Film Festival on September 4, 2014. It was premiered in Los Angeles on October 1, 2014, at the Beverly Hills' Academy of Motion Picture Arts and Sciences. The film was released on October 10, 2014, in the United States.

Box office
The Judge grossed $13.1million in its opening weekend in the United States and Canada, where it went on to earn $47.1million, adding $37.3million in other territories, for a worldwide total of $84.4million, against a budget of $45–$50million.

Critical response
 

Film critic Richard Roeper gave the film a "C" rating, saying that it was "surprising how little we care about these characters."

Geoffrey Macnab of The Independent wrote, "For all its contrivances and occasional lapses into On Golden Pond-style mawkishness, this is a richly crafted yarn that boasts barnstorming, if very showy performances from Duvall and Downey Jr." Peter Bradshaw of The Guardian gave a mixed to positive review, writing, "There are plenty of emotional fireworks in this big, soupy but entertaining picture, which is obvious Oscar bait." Entertainment Weekly critic Chris Nashawaty gave the film a "B" rating, and stated, "I don't expect The Judge to usher in a new era of legal thrillers, but I'm happy to see Downey leave the Marvel universe and Baker Street behind."

Accolades

References

External links
 
 

2014 films
2014 drama films
2010s legal drama films
American courtroom films
American legal drama films
Dune Entertainment films
Films about dysfunctional families
Films directed by David Dobkin
Incest in film
Films scored by Thomas Newman
Films set in 2014
Films set in Chicago
Films set in Indiana
Films shot in Dedham, Massachusetts
Films with screenplays by Nick Schenk
Village Roadshow Pictures films
Warner Bros. films
Films about father–son relationships
Films about brothers
2010s English-language films
2010s American films